B&S may refer to:

 Bachelor and Spinster Balls, parties for rural singles in Australia
 Ball and socket, a type of joint in anatomy and engineering
 Ballybofey and Stranorlar, twin towns in Ireland
 Belle & Sebastian, a Scottish band
 Billings & Spencer, a former manufacturer founded by Charles E. Billings and Christopher Miner Spencer
 Bloomsburg and Sullivan Railroad
 Briggs & Stratton, a large manufacturer of air-cooled gasoline engines
 Bronshtein and Semendyayev, a mathematics book
 Brothers & Sisters (2006 TV series), an American television series
 Brown & Sharpe, a brand of metrological tools and machine tools
 Buffalo and Susquehanna Railroad